The James K. Polk State Office Building is a 24-story,  building in Nashville, Tennessee. Completed in 1981, the building was constructed on the site of the Andrew Jackson Hotel and is home to offices for state employees, the Tennessee State Museum's collection, and the Tennessee Performing Arts Center.

The building's unique construction has a center core that resembles a box made from structural steel from the ground to top floor. Starting at the top, each floor is supported by hanging from the core. This design leaves the area surrounding the core on the ground levels open and free from any columns.

External links
Emporis Listing

Skyscraper office buildings in Nashville, Tennessee
1981 establishments in Tennessee
Office buildings completed in 1981
James K. Polk